Master-Dik is the third EP by American alternative rock band Sonic Youth. It was released on November 4, 1987, in the United States by record label SST, and on January 22, 1988, in the United Kingdom by label Blast First.

Background 
Inspired by New York City hip hop from the late 1980s, the title song used a drum machine, sampled Kiss, and name-dropped Ciccone Youth, a Sonic Youth side project that would release an album the following year. The B-sides comprised several interview snippets, parody and/or cover songs that pay tribute to and/or mention the Ramones, the Jesus and Mary Chain, the Beatles, Sun Ra, Max Roach, Sonny Sharrock, George Benson, and Ringo Starr, plus short-form sound collages, field recordings, musique concrète, and human beatboxing. Dinosaur Jr.'s J. Mascis plays guitar on "Beat on the Brat".

Master-Dik's liner notes reprinted a rant by Ben Weasel from the November 1987 issue of the fanzine Maximumrocknroll. In the article, Weasel criticized Sonic Youth, Hüsker Dü and several other indie rock bands from the 1980s for eschewing punk rock for a boring classic rock sound. Etchings on the vinyl's inner groove read "Ciccone death rock dream tinkle" on one side, and "Humpy pumpy psychoacoustik frenzy" on the other. When it was originally released, the album sleeve bore a sticker reading "Not as good as Atomizer, so don't get your hopes up, cheese!" The same sticker appeared on Big Black's 1987 EP Headache, and referred to that band's previous album.

Track listing

Personnel 
 Sonic Youth

 Thurston Moore
 Kim Gordon
 Lee Ranaldo
 Steve Shelley

 Additional personnel

 J. Mascis – guitar ("Master-Dik")
 Martin Bisi – engineer ("Master-Dik")
 Bill Titus – engineering ("Master-Dik")
 Wharton Tiers – engineering ("Beat on the Brat")
 Peter Anderson – sleeve photography
 Terry Pearson – mixing ("Under the Influence of The Jesus and Mary Chain / Ticket to Ride / Master-Dik (Version) / Introducing the Stars")

References

External links 

 

1987 EPs
1988 EPs
Rap rock EPs
Sonic Youth EPs
SST Records EPs